The omukuli is a type of flute found in Uganda.  It is played both as a solo and accompaniment instrument. It is made out of a variety of materials that have a square hole chipped out of one of the ends. It has finger holes that help in playing different pitches and melody. 

The player directs a stream of air over the sharp rim or on top of the pipe. It has a pentatonic scale, sol, la, do, re, mi, or do, re, mi, sol, la.  Endere is tuned on the xylophone key since the xylophone is omnipresent throughout Uganda.

Ugandan musical instruments
End-blown flutes